Minignan Department is a department of Folon Region in Denguélé District, Ivory Coast. In 2021, its population was 61,637 and its seat is the settlement of Minignan. The sub-prefectures of the department are Kimbirila-Nord, Minignan, Sokoro, and Tienko.

History

Minignan Department was created in 2005 as a second-level subdivision via a split-off from Odienné Department. At its creation, it was part of Denguélé Region.

In 2011, districts were introduced as new first-level subdivisions of Ivory Coast. At the same time, regions were reorganised and became second-level subdivisions and all departments were converted into third-level subdivisions. At this time, Minignan Department became part of Folon Region in Denguélé District. At the same time, the department was split to create Kaniasso Department.

Notes

Departments of Folon Region
2005 establishments in Ivory Coast
States and territories established in 2005